Events from the year 1726 in France.

Incumbents 
Monarch: Louis XV

Events
 
 
 
 11 July – André-Hercule Cardinal de Fleury, recalled from exile by King Louis XV of France, banishes Louis Henri, Duke of Bourbon, and Madame de Prie from court.

Births
 

 14 January – Jacques-Donatien Le Ray, French supporter of the American Revolution (d. 1803)
 20 June – Louise Henriette of Bourbon, Duchess of Orléans, mother of Philippe Égalité (d. 1759)
 1 September – François-André Danican Philidor, French composer and chess player (d. 1795)

Deaths
 

 25 January – Guillaume Delisle, French cartographer (b. 1675)
 18 June – Michel Richard Delalande, French organist and composer (b. 1657)

See also

References

1720s in France